Donatas is a Lithuanian masculine given name and may refer to the following individuals:
Donatas Banionis (born 1924), Lithuanian actor
Donatas Kazlauskas (born 1994), Lithuanian footballer 
Donatas Malinauskas (1877-1942), Lithuanian politician and diplomat
Donatas Morkūnas (born 1957), Lithuanian politician, banker and lecturer
Donatas Motiejūnas (born 1990), Lithuanian  basketball center and power forward
Donatas Montvydas (born 1987), Lithuanian singer-songwriter
Donatas Nakrošius (born 1991), Lithuanian footballer 
Donatas Navikas (born 1983), Lithuanian football midfielder
Donatas Plungė (born 1960), Lithuanian hammer thrower 
Donatas Sabeckis (born 1992), Lithuanian basketball player
Donatas Škarnulis (born 1977), Lithuanian race walker and Olympic competitor
Donatas Slanina (born 1977),  Lithuanian basketball guard
Donatas Tarolis (born 1994), Lithuanian basketball player
Donatas Vėželis (born 1981), Lithuanian ballroom dancer 
Donatas Vencevičius (born 1973), Lithuanian football midfielder, coach and manager
Donatas Zavackas (born 1980), Lithuanian basketball power forward

Lithuanian masculine given names